Shahadat-e al Hiqma is a banned Islamist terrorist organization in Bangladesh.

History 
Shahadat-e al Hiqma was established on 8 February 2003 by Kawsar Hossain Siddique. It is believed to be funded by Dawood Ibrahim. It announced that it would wage an armed struggle to establish an Islamic State in Bangladesh. Siddique claimed his group had 35 thousand "commandos" and "fighters". It was banned on 9 February 2003 by the Government of Bangladesh. Siddiquee was arrested on 9 November 2005.

In July 2011, Siddique was arrested from Rajshahi after Bangladesh Police "found" a three year old "missing" warrant in his name. Siddique was also a member of the Freedom Party. He has in the past referred to the Bangladesh Liberation war as  "terrorist activity". He founded Himaloy Beverage Company which according to him is a 5 billion taka company. He was sent to jail on 28 July 2011.

It was investigated by the National Investigation Agency of India for the 2014 Burdwan blast in West Bengal.

References 

Jihadist groups in Bangladesh
Terrorism in Bangladesh
Organizations established in 2003
2003 establishments in Bangladesh